Olearia montana  is a species of flowering plant in the family Asteraceae and is endemic to the Southern Tablelands of New South Wales. It is a shrub with hairy, elliptic leaves with toothed edges, and mauve and purple daisy-like inflorescences.

Description
The lower surface of the leaves is covered with felt-like hairs, similar to those on the stems. There are three or four rows of bracts at the base of each head, forming a hemispherical involucre. Flowering occurs in September and October and the fruit is a glabrous achene, the pappus with 35 to 71 bristles.

Taxonomy
Olearia montana was first formally described in 1991 by Nicholas Sèan Lander in the journal Telopea from plant material collected in the Tinderry Mountains by Thomas Gordon Hartley in 1971. The specific epithet (montana) refers to the montane habit of this species.

Distribution and habitat
Olearia montana grows in forest and woodland in the Tinderry, Brindabella and Scabby Ranges on the Southern Tablelands of New South Wales.

References

montana
Flora of New South Wales
Plants described in 1991